Kim Tae-hyung (born December 30, 1995), also known professionally as V, is a South Korean singer and member of the boy band BTS. Since his debut with the group in 2013, V has released three solo tracks under their name—"Stigma" in 2016, "Singularity" in 2018, and "Inner Child" in 2020—all of which charted on South Korea's Gaon Digital Chart. He appeared on the soundtrack for the television series Hwarang: The Poet Warrior Youth in 2016 and released his first independent song, the self-composed "Scenery", in 2019.

Early life and education 
V was born Kim Tae-hyung on December 30, 1995, in the Seo District of Daegu, and grew up in Geochang County. He is the eldest of three children, with a younger brother and sister. V first aspired to be a professional singer in elementary school. With his father's support, he began taking saxophone lessons in early middle school as a means of pursuing a musical career. V eventually became a trainee for Big Hit Entertainment after passing an audition in Daegu.

After graduating from Korean Arts High School in 2014, V enrolled in Global Cyber University, graduating in August 2020 with a major in Broadcasting and Entertainment. As of 2021, he is enrolled at Hanyang Cyber University, pursuing a Master of Business Administration in Advertising and Media.

Career

2013–present: BTS 

Pre-debut, he was the "secret member" of BTS. Fans were unaware of his existence as his agency wished to keep him a surprise. He stated the concept had made him feel uneasy and lonely as he thought it was because he might get cut from the lineup. On June 13, 2013, he made his debut as a member of BTS on Mnet's M Countdown with the track "No More Dream" from their debut single album, 2 Cool 4 Skool. He was first credited for music composition in The Most Beautiful Moment in Life, Part 1 as a co-writer and producer of the song "Hold Me Tight". He also contributed to writing lyrics for the song "Fun Boyz", co-composed by bandmate Suga. On the song "Run", from the album The Most Beautiful Moment in Life, Part 2, V's melody was used with Jungkook's original lyrics. V contributed as a songwriter and composer on his solo track "Stigma" from BTS' studio album Wings (2016). V also released, unofficially, a cover of "Hug Me" with bandmate J-Hope, as well as a cover of "Someone Like You" by Adele.

In May 2018, V's second solo song, "Singularity" was released as a trailer for BTS' then-upcoming third studio album, Love Yourself: Tear. The track made its UK radio debut on BBC Radio on October 25. One month after its release, The Guardian added "Singularity" to its "Top 50 songs for the month of June 2018" playlist, and Billboard included it in their critics' list of the "Top 50 BTS songs" at number 28. Overall, "Singularity" was generally well received by critics and mentioned on several year-end critic's lists. The New York Times ranked it twentieth on its list of "The 65 Best Songs of 2018" alongside "Fake Love", Los Angeles Times critic Mikael Wood named it the fourth "best and most replay worthy song of 2018", and Guardian critic Laura Snapes included it as one of her favourite tracks in her "Best Music of 2018: Albums and Tracks" list.

On October 24, V became one of the youngest recipients of the fifth-class Hwagwan Order of Cultural Merit medal, awarded to him by the President of South Korea along with the other members of BTS for their role in the spread of culture.

V, together with bandmate J-Hope, collaborated with Swedish singer Zara Larsson on the song "A Brand New Day" for the soundtrack album of their mobile game BTS World. It was released on June 14, 2019 and debuted at number one on the World Digital Song Sales chart. Eight months later, he collaborated with bandmate Jimin on the song "Friends" and helped compose and write his solo song "Inner Child" on BTS' studio album Map of the Soul: 7.

In July 2021, V was appointed Special Presidential Envoy for Future Generations and Culture by South Korean President Moon Jae-in, along with the other members of BTS, to help "lead the global agenda for future generations" and "expand South Korea's diplomatic efforts and global standing" in the international community.

2016–present: Solo activities 

In 2016, V made his acting debut with a supporting role in KBS2's historical drama Hwarang: The Poet Warrior Youth under his real name. He also collaborated with bandmate Jin on the duet "It's Definitely You" for the show's soundtrack. To celebrate BTS' fourth anniversary, V released "4 O'Clock" on June 8, 2017, a song he co-produced with bandmate RM.

V released his first independent song, "Scenery", on January 30, 2019, through the BTS SoundCloud page. V wrote and composed the ballad and photographed the cover art himself. The track was produced by Big Hit producer Docskim, with additional contributions from Pdogg and Hiss Noise. It reached 100 million streams from 20 million in over fourteen days, a new record on the platform. Over the course of the two weeks following its release, "Scenery" broke the daily streaming record nine times. Seven months later, V released his second solo and first all-English song, "Winter Bear", through SoundCloud, accompanied by a self-directed music video via BTS' YouTube channel on August 9. He co-produced the track with RM, Hiss Noise, and Adora, and photographed the cover artwork under his pseudonym Vante.

In 2020, V contributed the indie pop single "Sweet Night" to the soundtrack of the JTBC drama Itaewon Class, released on March 13. Self-written and produced,  it received generally favorable reviews for its composition, vocal performance and warm lyrics, debuting at number two on Billboard's US Digital Songs chart. On December 25, he released the Christmas-themed song "Snow Flower", featuring Peakboy.

In 2021, V participated in the original soundtrack for the Studio N television series Our Beloved Summer. His single, titled "Christmas Tree", was released on December 24. It debuted at number 79 on the Billboard Hot 100 and earned V his first solo entry on the chart. The following year, V starred in the Disney+ reality series In the Soop: Friendcation with Peakboy, Park Seo-joon, Choi Woo-shik, and Park Hyung-sik. He next appeared in the Prime Video exclusive cooking-travel series Jinny's Kitchen, alongside Park Seo-joon and Choi, in 2023. The series will begin airing on February 24.

Artistry 
V possesses a baritone singing voice that has received a generally positive critical reception, with particular praise for his vocal range and "husky" tone. He gained wider vocal recognition for his performance of his solo song "Stigma", and was praised for his falsettos that showed off his vocal range and unique musicality. V's tonality on "Singularity", the opening track of BTS' Love Yourself: Tear (2018), was noted as a prominent "tone setter" on the album by music critic Blanca Méndez. Similarly, Katie Goh of Vice deemed it as "one of V's best vocal performances." Karen Ruffini of Elite Daily stated in their article that "V... has no problem producing super soothing, low tones that are a key element in the overall sound for BTS," with Tamar Herman from Billboard also noting that V's lower range is a prominent piece of BTS' music. V's musicality is heavily influenced by his love for jazz and classical music. Eric Benet and Ruben Studdard are among his inspirations.

As a performer, V is known for its "duality", or his ability to evoke various emotions on stage. British journalist Rhian Daly, writing for NME, particularly noted this when discussing V's performance of "Singularity" during the Love Yourself: Speak Yourself World Tour, describing his movements as "precise and deliberate". Crystal Bell from MTV noted V's performances often work with live cameras in concert venues, and how he utilizes them to create subtle expressions during performances.

Impact and influence 
V coined the phrase "I purple you" during BTS' fanmeeting in November 2016; since then, purple has become a symbol of BTS and their fans. UNICEF used the phrase in their anti-bullying campaign with BTS.

In 2018, Eugene Investment & Securities Co., Ltd. conducted analytical research on Google search trends relating to the K-pop industry. "V" ranked first on the chart as the most-searched keyword for the past five years in South Korea. In a survey conducted by Gallup Korea, V was chosen as the fourth most-preferred idol of 2019, previously ranking ninth in 2018. In 2021, he ranked as the most popular Korean celebrity in Japan for twenty-eight consecutive weeks.

Various artists have cited him as an influence and role model: The Boyz's Younghoon and Hwall; Golden Child's Jaehyun and Jangjun; MVP's Been; Rainz's Byun Hyun-min; Cravity's Serim; Ateez's Yeosang and Mingi; D-Crunch's Jungseung and Dyla; Lucente's Bao; Newkidd's Yunmin; Boy Story's Hanyu; Tomorrow X Together's Beomgyu; Produce X 101 contestants Koo Jungmo, Lee Taeseung and Mahiro Hidaka; and former Wanna One member Park Ji-hoon.

Personal life 
Since 2018, V has lived in Hannam-dong, Seoul, South Korea with his bandmates. In July 2019, he bought an apartment worth US$4.55 million.

Health 
In October 2018, during the Love Yourself World Tour concert in Paris, V had difficulty singing due to an illness and had to abstain from some of his parts during the concert. In October 2021 it was announced V would abstain from choreography during their Permission to Dance on Stage concerts due to a calf injury and would remain seated while singing.

Discography

Singles

Other songs

Writing credits 

All song credits are adapted from the Korea Music Copyright Association's database, unless otherwise noted.

Filmography

Television series

Music videos

Television show

Hosting

Trailers and short films

Awards and nominations

State honors

World records

Notes

References

External links 

1995 births
K-pop singers
South Korean male singers
South Korean pop singers
21st-century South Korean male actors
South Korean male idols
Japanese-language singers of South Korea
English-language singers from South Korea
BTS members
Living people
People from Daegu
South Korean male television actors
21st-century South Korean singers
Recipients of the Order of Cultural Merit (Korea)
South Korean baritones
Hybe Corporation artists